The Lynn Creek Shelter, designated by the Smithsonian trinomial 3BV19, is a prehistoric archaeological site in Van Buren County, Arkansas.  Set on a bluff of the eastern Ozark Mountains, the site includes evidence of human habitation from about 8000 BCE to the historic contact period.  The site has been disturbed by unauthorized activities.

The site was listed on the National Register of Historic Places in 1978.

See also
 Edgemont Shelter: NRHP-listed in Van Buren County
 National Register of Historic Places listings in Van Buren County, Arkansas

References

Archaeological sites on the National Register of Historic Places in Arkansas
National Register of Historic Places in Van Buren County, Arkansas
Native American history of Arkansas